The Punisher (re-titled Frank Castle: The Punisher after issue #66; sometimes referred to as The Punisher MAX) was a comic book ongoing series published under the MAX imprint of Marvel Comics, featuring vigilante and antihero the Punisher.

Publication history
Garth Ennis, also writer of the 2000 and 2001 Punisher series, wrote issues #1–60 of the series. Also like the earlier series, Tim Bradstreet provided the covers for those issues. Continuing his run on the character, Ennis used the freedom of the MAX imprint to write more graphic and hard-edged stories than had previously been seen. Ennis also wrote two miniseries accompanying the main series, The Punisher Presents: Barracuda and Born, and several one-shots.

With issue #61, Gregg Hurwitz replaced Ennis as writer, joining artist Laurence Campbell to do a five-issue story arc. With issue #66 released on January 21, 2009, the series was re-titled Frank Castle: The Punisher, with writer Duane Swierczynski and artist Michel Lacombe coming to the series. Victor Gischler came on board for the storyline "Welcome to the Bayou" in issues #71–74 before the title finished with issue #75, a double-length issue with stories by Thomas Piccirilli, Gregg Hurwitz, Duane Swierczynski, Peter Milligan, and Charlie Huston.

The title was relaunched as Punisher MAX in late 2009, with writer Jason Aaron and artist Steve Dillon.

Plot

Differences from the mainstream Marvel Universe Punisher
The series explicitly does not use a floating timeline like the mainstream Marvel Universe, instead presenting a Punisher who ages in real time. Gravestones and other references indicate that his family was killed in 1976. The Punisher has been active for almost 30 years at the time presented in most stories, with issue #19 specifying that he has killed approximately 2,000 people. Born also establishes that the Punisher's service in the Vietnam War is still in MAX continuity.

Promotional art for the cover of Punisher #44 (March 2007), gives Frank Castle's birth date as February 16, 1950, but that was removed for the published issues. The story "Valley Forge, Valley Forge" corroborates this date, referring to Castle as "a twenty-one year old Captain" in April 1971.

Another major difference is the complete lack of superheroes and supervillains in the series, although non-superpowered characters from the Punisher's past, most notably Microchip, do make appearances. Nick Fury also makes several notable appearances, with his characterization echoing Ennis' MAX-imprint Fury stories. However, the character Jen Cooke, a social worker, appeared in the Marvel Knights storyline "Hidden". She then appeared in the MAX storyline "Slavers". The character Yorkie Mitchell made appearances in both the Marvel Knights and the MAX Punisher comics.

In the Civil War Files comic, just before the "Civil War" storyline was published, Iron Man talked about events in the Punisher's past from the Marvel Knights and MAX comics, which indicated that it did happen in the mainstream Marvel Universe at some point:

"Captain Frank Castle, sole survivor of the Firebase Valley Forge massacre".
"Although recently Castle has escalated his war on crime even further, with record-breaking body counts, he is paradoxically now rarely encountered in the field by any super hero save Daredevil".
"It's almost like he inhabits two worlds, one where heroes can capture him and one where they can't, and he can slip from one to the other with ease".

Many characters are past or current intelligence and military operatives from governmental agencies like the American CIA, the Soviet KGB and the British SIS and SAS and militaries and militias from the Balkans, the Middle East and the IRA, all with agendas rooted in past conflicts like the Cold War or the Yugoslav Wars.

Prints

Issues

As of issue #66, the series was officially re-titled Frank Castle: The Punisher.

Collected editions

Trade paperbacks

Hardcovers

Complete Collections

Omnibus

Reception
The series holds an average rating of 7.9 by 38 professional critics on the review aggregation website Comic Book Roundup.

In other media

Film
 The 2008 movie Punisher: War Zone starring Ray Stevenson is inspired by Punisher MAX, most notably incorporating characters from that series such as Gaitano Cesare, Carmine "Pittsy" Gazzerra, Ink, Cristu Bulat, Tiberiu Bulat and Maginty. The scene where Frank Castle/the Punisher kills Gaitano Cesare and the other mobsters is also taken directly from the storyline "In the Beginning", albeit cutting the head off the former instead of a headshot.

Television
 The second season of Daredevil loosely adapts the "Kitchen Irish" story arc, while adding in the titular character into the story alongside Frank Castle/the Punisher (portrayed by Jon Bernthal).
 The first season of The Punisher has William Rawlins as its main antagonist, a character who first appeared in issue #14.

References

External links

 

2004 comics debuts
2009 comics endings
Comics by Garth Ennis
Comics set in New York City
Defunct American comics